Usovsky is a rural locality (a settlement) in Solikamsky District, Perm Krai, Russia. The population was 413 as of 2010. There are 16 streets.

Geography 
Usovsky is located 16 km southeast of Solikamsk (the district's administrative centre) by road. Volodino is the nearest rural locality.

References 

Rural localities in Solikamsky District